In differential algebra, Picard–Vessiot theory is the study of the differential field extension generated by the solutions of a linear differential equation, using the differential Galois group of the field extension.  A major goal is to describe when the differential equation can be solved by quadratures in terms of properties of the differential Galois group. The theory was initiated by Émile Picard and Ernest Vessiot from about 1883 to 1904.

 and  give detailed accounts of Picard–Vessiot theory.

History

The main result of their theory says very roughly that a linear differential equation can be solved by quadratures if and only if its differential Galois group is connected and solvable. Unfortunately it is hard to tell exactly what they proved as the concept of being "solvable by quadratures" is not defined precisely or used consistently in their papers.  gave precise definitions of the necessary concepts and proved a rigorous version of this theorem.

 extended Picard–Vessiot theory to partial differential fields (with several commuting derivations).

 described an algorithm for deciding whether second order homogeneous linear equations can be solved by quadratures, known as Kovacic's algorithm.

Picard–Vessiot extensions and rings
An extension F ⊆ K of differential fields is called a Picard–Vessiot extension if all constants are in F and K can be generated by adjoining the solutions of a homogeneous linear ordinary differential polynomial.

A Picard–Vessiot ring R over the differential field F  is a differential ring over F that is simple (no differential ideals other than 0 and R) and generated as a k-algebra by the coefficients of A and 1/det(A), where A is an invertible matrix over F such that B = A′/A has coefficients in F. (So A is a fundamental matrix for the differential equation y′ = By.)

Liouvillian extensions
An extension F ⊆ K of differential fields is called Liouvillian if all constants are in F, and K can be generated by adjoining a finite number of integrals, exponential of integrals, and algebraic functions. Here, an integral of an element a is defined to be any solution of y′ = a, and an exponential of an integral of a is defined to be any solution of y′ = ay.

A Picard–Vessiot extension is Liouvillian if and only if the identity component of its differential Galois group is solvable. More precisely, extensions by algebraic functions correspond to finite differential Galois groups, extensions by integrals correspond to subquotients of the differential Galois group that are 1-dimensional and unipotent, and extensions by exponentials of integrals correspond to subquotients of the differential Galois group that are 1-dimensional and reductive (tori).

Sources

External links

Differential algebra